Anthony "Tony" da Silva (born 20 December 1980) is a Portuguese former professional footballer who played as a right-back.

Playing career
The son of a Portuguese couple, Silva was born in Le Creusot, Saône-et-Loire. After spending a decade in the youth academy of Paris Saint-Germain FC, he returned to his parents' hometown of Chaves in his teens, making his debut in professional football at the age of 20 with G.D. Chaves in the Segunda Liga and remaining four years with the club at that level.

Silva made his Primeira Liga debut in the 2005–06 season, only missing two games as C.F. Estrela da Amadora easily retained their league status. In January 2007 he moved abroad, signing with CFR Cluj in Romania.

During his spell at Cluj, Silva quickly became a fan favourite for his strong work ethic and dedication, eventually gaining team captaincy. During his stint he won six major titles, including two Liga I championships, contributing a total of 50 appearances and one goal to those conquests (32 matches in 2007–08). In the following campaign he suffered a knee ligament injury which sidelined him for several weeks, but he still recovered in time to help the club win the domestic cup for the second time in its history.

Silva returned to his country in January 2011 and signed with Vitória de Guimarães, aged 30. In the same transfer window but the following year, he joined fellow league side F.C. Paços de Ferreira.

On 5 May 2013, Silva scored his only goal in the Portuguese top flight, netting through a rare header to help his team defeat Sporting CP 1–0 at home and cling on to a best-ever third position in the league, with the subsequent qualification to the UEFA Champions League. He finished his career in 2015, following a spell with F.C. Penafiel in the same tier.

Coaching career
After becoming a manager, Silva worked mainly in the lower leagues or amateur football. The exception to this was late into the 2015–16 season, when he went from assistant to interim at Académico de Viseu F.C. after Ricardo Chéu was dismissed by the second division club.

In October 2019, Silva left Chaves' youths and joined his compatriot Toni Conceição's staff at the Cameroon national team, as a video analyst.

Honours
CFR Cluj
Liga I: 2007–08, 2009–10
Cupa României: 2007–08, 2008–09, 2009–10
Supercupa României: 2009, 2010

References

External links

1980 births
Living people
French people of Portuguese descent
Sportspeople from Le Creusot
Portuguese footballers
French footballers
Footballers from Bourgogne-Franche-Comté
Association football defenders
Paris Saint-Germain F.C. players
Primeira Liga players
Liga Portugal 2 players
Segunda Divisão players
G.D.R.C. Os Sandinenses players
G.D. Chaves players
C.F. Estrela da Amadora players
Vitória S.C. players
F.C. Paços de Ferreira players
F.C. Penafiel players
Liga I players
CFR Cluj players
Portuguese expatriate footballers
French expatriate footballers
Expatriate footballers in Romania
Portuguese expatriate sportspeople in Romania
French expatriate sportspeople in Romania
Portuguese football managers
French football managers
Liga Portugal 2 managers
Académico de Viseu F.C. managers
Portuguese expatriate sportspeople in Cameroon
French expatriate sportspeople in Cameroon